Hypena longipennis is a moth in the family Erebidae first described by Francis Walker in 1866. It is found in India, China and Taiwan.

The wingspan is 34–39 mm.

References

Moths described in 1866
longipennis
Moths of Taiwan